A Night at the Village Vanguard is a live album by tenor saxophonist Sonny Rollins released on Blue Note Records in 1958. It was recorded at the Village Vanguard in New York City in November 1957 from three sets, two in the evening and one in the afternoon with different sidemen. For the afternoon set, Rollins played with Donald Bailey on bass and Pete LaRoca on drums; in the evening they were replaced respectively by Wilbur Ware and Elvin Jones.

Recording

The recording was made by Rudy Van Gelder, and was the first live recording made at the Village Vanguard.

Reception
The AllMusic review by Scott Yanow states: "This CD is often magical. Sonny Rollins, one of jazz's great tenors, is heard at his peak... Not only did Rollins have a very distinctive sound, but his use of time, his sly wit, and his boppish but unpredictable style were completely his own by 1957." Music critic Robert Christgau highly praised the album, writing: "Rollins is charged with venturing far out from these tunes without severing the harmonic moorings normally secured by a piano. He does it again and again – but not without a certain cost in ebullience, texture, and fullness of breath. Impressive always, fun in passing, his improvisations are what avant-garde jazz is for." The album was identified by Scott Yanow in his Allmusic essay "Hard Bop" as one of the 17 Essential Hard Bop Recordings. The Penguin Guide to Jazz gave it a maximum four stars plus crown, and included the album in its “core collection”, concluding that "these are record[ing]s which demand a place in any collection".

Re-releases
More material from the recording session was discovered in 1976 and released as the double album More from the Vanguard. In 1987, the material from the original and double album was reconstructed in chronological order as two compact discs.

On September 14, 1999, the remastered album was reissued by Blue Note as part of its Rudy Van Gelder series.

Track listing
All tracks from the evening sets except as indicated.

1987 reissue track listing
All tracks from the evening sets except as indicated; program in chronological order as presented originally.

Personnel
Sonny Rollins — tenor saxophone
Wilbur Ware — double bass
Donald Bailey — double bass on afternoon set
Elvin Jones — drums
Pete LaRoca — drums on afternoon set
Technical
Rudy Van Gelder - recording
Reid Miles - cover design
Francis Wolff - cover photography

References

1958 live albums
Blue Note Records live albums
Sonny Rollins live albums
Albums produced by Alfred Lion
Albums recorded at the Village Vanguard